Michael E. Zimmerman (born July 7, 1946) is an American integral theorist whose interests include Buddhism, Martin Heidegger, Friedrich Nietzsche, and Ken Wilber. After a year as assistant professor at Denison University, he was Professor of Philosophy at Tulane University from 1975 to 2005, and Director of the Institute for Humanities and the Arts at Tulane. He is also affiliated with the Integral Institute. Together with Sean Esbjörn-Hargens, he wrote a book on integral ecology, Integral Ecology: Uniting Multiple Perspectives on the Natural World. Since 2006, Zimmerman has been a faculty member at the University of Colorado at Boulder.

Zimmerman is a specialist concerning 20th century German philosopher Martin Heidegger and has published a number of books and peer-reviewed articles on Heidegger's work, and on other conventional philosophical topics.

Publications

Books
 Eclipse of the Self: The Development of Heidegger's Concept of Authenticity. Athens: Ohio University Press, 1981; second edition, 1986).
 Heidegger's Confrontation with Modernity: Technology, Politics, and Art Bloomington: Indiana University Press, 1990).
 Portuguese translation: Confronto de Heidegger com a Modernidade: Política, Arte, trans. João Sousa Ramos (Lisbon: Instituto Piaget, 2001).
 Contesting Earth’s Future: Radical Ecology and Postmodernity (The University of California Press, 1994).
 Chinese translation underway with tentative title: Li Nun Zheng Feng : Ju Jiao Di Qiu Wei Lai (Shanghai: Shanghai Joint Publishing Company).
 ed. The Thought of Martin Heidegger, Tulane Studies in Philosophy,  Vol. XXXII,  (New Orleans, 1984).
 ed. Environmental Philosophy: From Animal Rights to Radical Ecology (Englewood Cliffs: Prentice-Hall, 1993). Second edition, 1998. Third edition, 2001. Fourth edition  2004.(?)

See also
 American philosophy
 List of American philosophers

References

External links
 Official v.v. at University of Colorado
 The Z Files by Mary Ann Travis article on his work with his alien abduction phenomena
 Interview with Laureano Ralón @ Figure/Ground

American philosophers
Heidegger scholars
Integral theory (Ken Wilber)
Living people
1946 births
Tulane University faculty
University of Colorado Boulder faculty
Continental philosophers